Perlongipalpus is a genus of Asian dwarf spiders that was first described by K. Y. Eskov & Y. M. Marusik in 1991.

Species
 it contains four species, found in Russia and Mongolia:
Perlongipalpus mannilai Eskov & Marusik, 1991 – Russia
Perlongipalpus mongolicus Marusik & Koponen, 2008 – Mongolia
Perlongipalpus pinipumilis Eskov & Marusik, 1991 (type) – Russia
Perlongipalpus saaristoi Marusik & Koponen, 2008 – Russia

See also
 List of Linyphiidae species (I–P)

References

Araneomorphae genera
Linyphiidae
Spiders of Asia
Spiders of Russia